Transformative justice is a series of practices and philosophies designed to create change in social systems. Mostly, they are alternatives to criminal justice in cases of interpersonal violence, or are used for dealing with socioeconomic issues in societies transitioning away from conflict or repression. Other fields of practice have adopted transformative justice, including to address groups' work on other social issues and climate justice.

Description 
As per the works of American activist Mariame Kaba, transformative justice is a political framework that focuses on community-building and collective solidarity against the repressive mechanisms of the state. First popularized by LGBTQIA2S+, Black, Indigenous, Latine, and otherwise marginalized communities due to their perception that they were unable to rely on the police and the courts to obtain justice after being victimized by interpersonal harm (such as hate crimes, sexual assaults, and domestic violence), it prioritizes the importance of relationships with oneself, one's community, and one's environment.

Transformative justice divests from traditional methods of state-sanctioned punishment, such as police, prisons, courts and juvenile delinquency programs, as it is premised on the assumption that these institutions inflict more harm on individuals through surveillance and social control, which fosters even more violence and harm both within prisons and communities on the outside.

Transformative justice also rests on the belief that interpersonal harm reflects systemic and institutional dimensions of oppression. For instance, sexual assault mirrors the patriarchal conception of women as devoid of personal agency. Therefore, transformative justice asserts that in order to eradicate interpersonal violence, the systemic structures of power (such as patriarchy, cisheteronormativity, racism, ableism, and colonialism) must also be dismantled.

Transformative justice takes the principles and practices of restorative justice beyond the criminal justice system. It applies to areas such as environmental law, corporate law, labor-management relations, consumer bankruptcy and debt, and family law. Transformative justice uses a systems approach, seeking to see problems, as not only the beginning of the crime but also the causes of crime, and tries to treat an offense as a transformative relational and educational opportunity for victims, offenders and all other members of the affected community.  In theory, a transformative justice model can apply even between peoples with no prior contact.

The lineage of contemporary strands of transformative justice practices remains rooted in other anti-carceral and abolitionist social movements that emanate from Black, Indigenous and other racialized communities.  Transformative justice is distinguishable from restorative justice in that transformative justice places emphasis on addressing and repairing harm outside of the State.  Writer and transformative justice practitioner adrienne maree brown for example uses the example of a person who has stolen money in order to buy food to sustain themselves: “if the racialized system of capitalism has produced such inequality that someone who is hungry and steals a purse to resource a meal, returning the purse with an apology or community service to does nothing to address that hunger”.  Instead, transformative justice requires “the work of addressing harm at the root, outside the mechanisms of the state, so that we can grow into the right relationship with one another”.   

Transformative justice is further distinguishable from restorative justice in that, as many activists and movements stress, the latter is more easily vulnerable to state co-optation.  
While many of the goals of restorative justice intersect or are compatible with the goals of transformative justice, many restorative justice practices tend to operate within the confines of existing state structures, such as within jails or through community programs involving law enforcement.  For example, many restorative justice initiatives take place directly within jails and involve a collaborative relationship with law enforcement or with state sponsored justice systems.  As Mimi Kim writes:

“What most of these restorative justice programs share, however, is a collaborative tie to law enforcement, a fact often taken for granted or just as easily overlooked as the promise of restoration rather than retribution distracts attention from the carceral conditions that still bind many of these practices. While pitched as an alternative to the machinery of mass incarceration, restorative justice programs are often initiated from within or in close collaboration with the criminal legal system,
Leaving its assumptions, its personnel, and its program design within the logic and institutions of the carceral state. In practice, this means that these programs, in large part, leave the selection of cases and, likewise, their potential withdrawal from qualification to prosecutors; failure to meet law enforcement standards may result in sentencing and incarceration; and a number of such programs are carried out entirely within the walls of jails and prisons.” 

A stark divide between restorative justice and transformative justice rests on the question of whether or not to engage with the criminal justice system in navigating responses to instances of harms or violence.    It is the reliance on or collaboration with formalized or state systems of justice that distinguishes restorative justice approaches from transformative justice ones. Thus, while restorative justice and transformative justice may share similar ideological underpinnings and goals, their set of approaches and tactics can be quite divergent. 

Adrienne Maree Brown contends that transformative justice cannot occur if the reaction to each committed transgression is one of a public takedown reminiscent of cancel culture, calling out the hypocrisy of thinkers in the movement who reproduce the same forms of violence in their disagreements that the transformative justice movement aims to obliterate. Brown offers some practical considerations to reflect on, in situations of conflict, that would allow for a collective pivot to transformative justice:
 deliberate listening with the goal of understanding the contexts that enabled a specific harm;
 learning from each conflict to help facilitate introspection;
 considering alternatives to public confrontation in response to conflict, such as personal exchange to breed trust, resilience and interdependence.

Transformative justice can be seen as a general philosophical strategy for responding to conflicts akin to peacemaking. Transformative justice is concerned with root causes and comprehensive outcomes. It is akin to healing justice more than other alternatives to imprisonment.

In contrast to restorative justice, no quantification or assessment of loss or harms or any assignment of the role of victim is made, and no attempt to compare the past (historical) and future (normative or predicted) conditions is made either. While restorative justice seeks to return the victim to their initial state before the harm occurred, transformative justice is more concerned with questioning whether the conditions in place before the harm are themselves equitable and just, and looks to redress them in order to prevent further harm within the community.  The victim is not normally part of the transformative process, but can choose to be. Participants agree only on what constitutes effective harms reduction, which may include separating or isolating perpetrator and victim. 

In contrast to equity-restorative justice, there is no social definition of equity imposed on participants. Each is free to decide on some "new normal" state of being for themselves, and is not pressured to agree on it. A victim may continue to seek revenge or desire punishment, e.g. as in retributive justice systems. A perpetrator may lack remorse and may say that they lack remorse. 

As in transformative learning, one works from desired future states back to the present steps required to reach them. The issue is not whether the perpetrator may make a choice to do something similar again, but whether the community is willing to support the victim and perpetrator in some form of contact. It is possible for the community to choose to support the perpetrator and not the victim as defined by the law, but if they do so they may be obligated to support some re-definition of "equity" so that law comes back into line with the social concept of equity. For example, it is possible for the community to support imprisonment as a means of isolation but not punishment.

This model for decarceration may have roots in the work of Samuel Tuke and B. F. Skinner but departs by relying on individual volunteers' caring and supporting capacity, not any socially imposed etiquette derived from civilization. Transformative justice theory has been advanced by Ruth Morris and Giselle Dias of the Canadian Quakers.

Anarchist criminology tends to favour holistic transformative justice approaches over restorative justice, which it tends to argue is too beholden to the existing criminal justice system.

Socioeconomic issues in transitional and post-conflict settings 
Transformative justice also refers to policy and practice responses to socioeconomic issues in societies transitioning away from conflict or repression. It is closely associated with the scholarship and practice of transitional justice, and refers to "transformative change that emphasises local agency and resources, the prioritisation of process rather than preconceived outcomes, and the challenging of unequal and intersecting power relationships and structures of exclusion at both local and global levels".

Climate justice 

Some climate justice approaches promote transformative justice where advocates focus on how vulnerability to climate change reflects various structural injustices in society, such as the exclusion of marginalized groups from decision-making and from climate resilient livelihoods, and that climate action must explicitly address these structural power imbalances. For these advocates, climate change provides an opportunity to reinforce democratic governance at all scales, and drive the achievement of gender equality and social inclusion. At a minimum, priority is placed on ensuring that responses to climate change do not repeat or reinforce existing injustices, which has both distributive justice and procedural justice dimensions. Other conceptions frame climate justice in terms of the need to curb climate change within certain limits, like the Paris Climate Agreement targets of 1.5C, otherwise the impacts of climate change on natural ecosystems will be so severe as to preclude the possibility of justice for many populations.

See also
Nonviolence
Prison abolition movement
Psychiatric imprisonment
Restorative justice
Retributive justice
Transformative learning

References

Further reading

External links
TransformHarm.org

Criminology
Justice